
Maclear may refer to:

People
 Sir Thomas Maclear (1794–1879), Irish-born South African astronomer
 Michael Maclear (1929-2018), Anglo-Canadian journalist, documentary filmmaker, and former correspondent
 George Maclear (born 1833), English clergyman, theological writer and headmaster
 John Maclear (1838–1907), commander of HMS Challenger from 1872 to 1876

Places
 Maclear, Eastern Cape, a town in the Eastern Cape province, South Africa
 Maclear Island (Queensland), an island in the Great Barrier Reef Marine Park
 Maclear (crater), a lunar crater

Other
Maclear's Rat, an extinct species of rat formerly found on Christmas Island